Daniel Ward (born June 3, 1963) is a South African professional light fly/fly/super fly/bantamweight boxer of the 1980s, '90s and 2000s who won the Transvaal flyweight title, South African flyweight title, and Commonwealth flyweight title, and was a challenger for the South African super flyweight title against Nkosana Vaaltein, World Boxing Association (WBA) Inter-Continental flyweight title against Mzukisi Sikali, and World Boxing Union (WBU) flyweight title against Sornpichai Kratingdaenggym, his professional fighting weight varied from , i.e. light flyweight to , i.e. bantamweight. He was trained by Carlos Jacamo.

References

External links

1963 births
Bantamweight boxers
Flyweight boxers
Light-flyweight boxers
Living people
Place of birth missing (living people)
Super-flyweight boxers
South African male boxers